Dr. Alan Jay Smith (born April, 1949) is a computer scientist and researcher in the field of development and applications of caching strategies and the measurement and analysis of computer storage systems with many important contributions to the field. He currently is professor emeritus at the EECS faculty of the University of California, Berkeley.

Selected awards 
 1988: IEEE Fellow
 2001: ACM Fellow for "his highly cited paper on cache memories, for his contributions to performance measurement, and for his leadership in professional society activities"
 2003: A. A. Michelson Award by the Computer Measurement Group
 2006: Harry H. Goode Memorial Award by the IEEE Computer Society for "leadership in the measurement and evaluation of cache and memory system performance"
 2008: IEEE Reynold B. Johnson Information Storage Systems Award for "contributions to the performance analysis of computer storage systems, including improvements to disk caches, prefetching and data placement"

References

External links 
 
 

American computer scientists
Cache (computing)
Fellows of the Association for Computing Machinery
Fellow Members of the IEEE
Fellows of the American Association for the Advancement of Science
Living people
UC Berkeley College of Engineering faculty
1951 births